Ringside is a live album released by Cold Chisel in 2003. Recorded over 4 nights in June 2003, it peaked at number 27 in 2003 and peaked at number 16 following its vinyl release on 12 November 2021.

Album details
The album contains two Steve Prestwich songs ("Lovelight", "All I Wanna Do") not released on any other Cold Chisel album, and "Fallen Angel" that later appeared on a solo Don Walker album. These were the first Cold Chisel songs to feature Prestwich and Walker on lead vocals.

Ringside features covers of Johnny Cash's "Big River", the standard "Cry Me a River", and Dragon's "Sunshine", written by Walker's friend Paul Hewson.

The concert was an attempt to feature the band, "performing in a smaller, intimate environment," and often, "in an acoustic format." Inspired by Elvis Presley's 1968 comeback special, there was a 360 degree view of the rotating stage, with the furthest seats from the stage being within 30 metres.

Track listing

Disc 1
"Home And Broken Hearted" – 4:14
"The Things I Love in You" – 3:06
"Cheap Wine" – 3:45
"Rosaline" – 6:19
"Breakfast at Sweethearts" – 3:59
"My Baby" – 4:13
"Houndog" – 4:59
"Plaza" – 2:48
"Fallen Angel" – 4:55
"Shipping Steel" – 4:13
"The Last Wave of Summer" – 5:49
"Pretty Little Thing" – 3:18
"Merry Go Round" – 4:25
"Forever Now" – 5:32
"Khe Sanh " – 4:47

Disc 2
"Cry Me a River" – 3:46
"Four Walls" – 3:08
"Lovelight" – 3:33
"When the War is Over" – 6:00
"All I Wanna Do (Steve Vocal)" – 3:26
"Big River" – 2:43
"Painted Doll" – 2:34
"Saturday Night" – 5:42
"You Got Nothing I Want" – 3:12
"Rising Sun" – 3:26
"Flame Trees" – 4:38
"Bow River" – 7:12
"Water Into Wine" – 4:46
"F-111" – 3:36
"Sunshine" – 5:46
"Goodbye (Astrid Goodbye)" – 4:34
"All I Wanna Do (Jimmy Vocal)" – 3:34

Charts

Certifications

References

Cold Chisel albums
2003 live albums
Live albums by Australian artists